Azygocera picturata is a species of beetle in the family Cerambycidae, the only species in the genus Azygocera.

References

Acanthoderini